Lars Gunnarson Hågå (before 1580 – after 1645) was a Norwegian farmer and lensmann in Lesja, Gudbrandsdalen.

He is remembered for his leading role during the Battle of Kringen in 1612, for which he was rewarded the farms of Hågå and Landheim, former Crown land, from the King.

References

16th-century Norwegian people
17th-century Norwegian people
People from Lesja
Norwegian farmers
Year of birth uncertain
Year of death uncertain